The Bolshoy Kanimasur mine is a large silver mine located in the Sughd Province of Tajikistan. Bolshoy Kanimasur is one largest silver reserves in Tajikistan, having estimated reserves of 1.57 billion oz of silver.

References 

Silver mines in Tajikistan